{{Infobox company
|name             = Telegames, Inc.
|logo             = Telegames.png
|logo_size        = 
|location_city    = Mabank, Texas
|location_country = U.S.
|industry         = Consumer electronics, video games
|products         = {{ubl|Ultimate Card Games|Ultimate Brain Games}}
|revenue          = 
|homepage         = 
}}

Telegames, Inc. is an American video game company based in Mabank, Texas, with a sister operation based in England.

Telegames was known for supporting not just modern game systems but also classic game systems, after they had been abandoned by its manufacturer. For example, by 1997 Telegames was the Atari Jaguar's only software publisher, and continued to publish for the system up through 1998. Effective September 2004 though, Telegames, Inc. ceased support for all "classic" and "orphaned" video game systems and software in order to support only modern consoles.

Today, the company focuses on modern gaming consoles by developing and publishing games for the Nintendo DS handheld game system and Apple's iPad.

Product history
Below is a list of all games that were either developed or published by Telegames, Inc.

Mobile phoneUniversal ChaosNintendo 3DSClassic Games Overload: Card & Puzzle EditionApple iPadSolitaire Overload Part 1 (now delisted)Solitaire Overload Part 2 (now delisted)Solitaire Overload Part 3 (now delisted)Solitaire Overload Complete (now delisted)

Nintendo DSSolitaire OverloadSolitaire Overload PlusUltimate Card GamesUltimate Puzzle Games: Sudoku Edition (2007)

Game Boy AdvanceBackTrackHardcore PinballSanta Claus Saves the Earth (only released in Europe, USA version cancelled)Soccer KidUltimate Arcade GamesUltimate Brain GamesUltimate Card GamesUltimate Puzzle GamesUltimate Winter GamesUrban Yeti!Atari 2600Astroblast (re-release, originally released by M Network)Bump 'N' Jump (re-release, originally released by Mattel Electronics)Glacier PatrolInternational Soccer (re-release, originally released by M Network)Kung Fu Superkicks (re-release, originally released by Xonox)Lock 'N' Chase (re-release, originally released by M Network)Night Stalker (re-release, originally released by M Network as Dark Cavern)Quest For Quintana Roo (re-release, originally released by Sunrise Software)Space Attack (re-release, originally released by M Network)Super Challenge Baseball (re-release, originally released by M Network)Super Challenge Football (re-release, originally released by M Network)Universal ChaosColecoVisionAlcazar: The Forgotten FortressAmazing Bumpman (originally planned to be released by Sunrise Software as Number Bumper)Boulder DashCosmic CrisisFathom (re-release, originally released by Imagic)Kung Fu Superkicks (re-release, originally released by Xonox)Motocross Racer (re-release, originally released by Xonox)Rock 'N' BoltSkiing (originally planned to be released by Coleco)Strike It!Tank WarsTournament Tennis (re-release, originally released by Imagic)

Coleco AdamKung Fu Superkicks (re-release, originally released by Xonox)

Atari LynxBubble TroubleDesert Strike: Return To The GulfDouble DragonEuropean Soccer ChallengeFat BobbyThe Fidelity Ultimate Chess ChallengeHyperdromeKrazy Ace Miniature GolfQixRaidenSuper Off-RoadAtari JaguarBreakout 2000Brutal Sports FootballInternational Sensible SoccerIron Soldier 2 (released both on the Atari Jaguar and Atari Jaguar CD)Towers II: Plight of the StargazerWorld Tour Racing (Atari Jaguar CD)WormsZero 5Game Boy ColorRhino RumbleShamus (released in North America by Vatical Entertainment)Towers: Lord Baniff's Deceit (released in North America by Vatical Entertainment)Yars' RevengeWindowsBackTrackClassic Gamer: ColecoVision Hits Volume 1Personal ArcadePlanet BlupiTowers II: Plight of the StargazerPlayStationIron Soldier 3Rascal RacersSanta Claus Saves the Earth (only released in Europe)Soccer Kid (only released in Europe)Ultimate Brain GamesCancelledClassic Games Overload: Board Game Edition (Nintendo 3DS)Hardcore Pool (Game Boy Advance)
Oggy and the Cockroaches (Game Boy Advance, cancelled for unknown reasons)Puzzle Overload (Nintendo DS)Ultimate Brain Games (Nintendo DS)Ultimate Pocket Games (Game Boy Advance)Towers II: Plight of the Stargazer'' (Game Boy Color)

Telegames Personal Arcade

The Telegames Personal Arcade was the US version of the Dina by Bit Corporation. This slim console could play both ColecoVision and SG-1000 cartridges. It came equipped with NES-styled controllers, and even had a built in game called "Meteoric Shower". Since the DINA control pads did not contain the numeric keypad of the actual ColecoVision controller, they were mounted on the unit itself. It also sported a "pause" button that could be used for SG-1000 games.

References

External links
Telegames official website

Atari 2600
Companies based in the Dallas–Fort Worth metroplex
Video game companies of the United States
Video game publishers